The 2001 United Nations Security Council election was held on 8 October 2001 at United Nations Headquarters in New York City during the 56th session of the United Nations General Assembly. The General Assembly elected five non-permanent members of the UN Security Council for two-year terms commencing on 1 January 2002.

The five candidates elected were Bulgaria, Cameroon, Guinea, Mexico, and Syria.

Geographic distribution
In accordance with the General Assembly's rules for the geographic distribution of the non-permanent members of the Security Council, and established practice, the members were to be elected as follows: two from Africa, one from Asia, one from Latin American and the Caribbean Group (GRULAC), and one from the Eastern European Group.

Candidates
There was a total of seven candidates for the five seats. In the African and Asian Groups, there were three candidates for the three seats: Cameroon, Guinea, and Syria. In the Eastern European Group, Belarus and Bulgaria competed for the one available seat. From the GRULAC states, the Dominican Republic and Mexico competed for the one available seat.

Results

Voting proceeded by secret ballot. For each geographic group, each member state could vote for as many candidates as were to be elected. There were 178 ballots in each of the three elections.

Group A — African and Asian States (three to be elected)
Guinea 173
Cameroon 172
Syria 160
invalid 1

Group B — Latin American and Caribbean States (one to be elected)
Mexico 116
Dominican Republic 60
Dominica 1
invalid 1

Second Round
Mexico 138
Dominican Republic 40

Group C — Eastern European Group (one to be elected)
Bulgaria 120
Belarus 53

With Bulgaria winning over Belarus, and Mexico overcoming the Dominican Republic in the second round, the final result was as follows: Bulgaria, Cameroon, Guinea, Mexico, and Syria were elected to the Security Council for two-year terms commencing 1 January 2002.

See also
List of members of the United Nations Security Council
Mexico and the United Nations

References
Official record of the vote
UN Document GA/9930 press release
UN News Centre

2001 elections
2001
2001 in international relations
Non-partisan elections
October 2001 events